Tiziano Siviero (born 28 October 1957 in Bassano del Grappa, Veneto) is an Italian rally co-driver. He is most closely associated with Miki Biasion, with whom he won 
the 1983 European Rally Championship on Lancia Rally 037, the 1988 World Rally Championship and the 1989 World Rally Championship on Lancia Delta Integrale.

Personal life
He is married and has two children. He and his family formally resided in Monte Carlo, Principality of Monaco before moving to the Italian island of Elba.
On 21 September 2022, in the evening, on the island of Elba where he has lived for years, he is involved in a serious accident with his scooter. He is currently hospitalized in serious condition at the hospital in Pisa.

Career

He started racing in the World Rally Championship since 1979 with Miki Biasion.
He was always co-pilot of Miki Biasion for his entire career from 1980 to 2001 in the World Rally Championship, the exception being the 22º Rallye de Portugal Vinho do Porto in 1988, where he was replaced by Carlo Cassina due to health problems.

WRC victories

Rally raid

2002
 2nd overall, Italian Baja with Jean-Pierre Fontenay on Mitsubishi Pajero.
 3rd overall, UAE Desert Challenge with Miki Biasion on Mitsubishi Pajero.

2003
 2nd overall, Rally of Tunisia with Miki Biasion on Mitsubishi Pajero.

References

External links
Tiziano Siviero at ewrc-results.com
Tiziano Siviero at juwra.com

1957 births
Italian rally co-drivers
Living people
Lancia people
World Rally Championship co-drivers